Citrus High School is located at 10760 Cypress Avenue in Fontana, California. It has been open since August 8, 2011. The current principal is Edward Campbell.

References

External links
 Official website

Education in Fontana, California
High schools in San Bernardino County, California
Public high schools in California
2011 establishments in California